Gerd Åsta Hjelm Arnesen (December 21, 1919 – April 4, 2003) was a Norwegian composer and lyricist. She wrote a number of Lille Grethe's hits, including "Teddyen min" (My Teddy). Hjelm also wrote songs for other artists, such as "Brevet jeg aldri sendte" (The Letter I Never Sent) for Åse Wentzel and "Flyktningegutten" (The Refugee Boy) for Harald Dyrkorn. She was appointed honorary ambassador of Horten in 1997.

Filmography
 1957: Selv om de er små 
 1957: Far til fire og onkel Sofus as Karin, Lille Grete's mother

References

External links
 

1919 births
2003 deaths
20th-century Norwegian composers
Norwegian women composers
People from Horten